The 1970 Torneo Descentralizado was the 54th season of the highest division of Peruvian football. Torino and SIMA made their debut in the first division this season. The national champion was Sporting Cristal while SIMA and Grau were relegated.

Competition modus
The season was divided into two phases. In the first phase the 14 teams played each other twice playing at least one home match and one away match. The teams that finished in first to seventh place advanced to the championship group which contested the national title. The teams that finished in eighth to fourteenth place advanced to the relegation group where they determined the two teams that would be relegated from the division. Teams carried their first phase results in the second phase and played the teams in their group at least once.

The points system during the season varied. In the first leg of the first phase—the first 13 rounds—2 points were awarded for a win, 1 point for a draw and no points for a loss; in the second leg of the first phase—the last 13 rounds—and in the second stage a win was awarded 4 points, a draw was awarded 2 points and no points were awarded for a loss.

Teams

First phase

Second phase

Final group

Relegation group

External links
Peru 1970 season at RSSSF

Peruvian Primera División seasons
Peru
1970 in Peruvian football